The Swan 46 Mk III was designed by German Frers and built by Nautor's Swan; launch was in 2004. It marked a shift in approach as Swan marketed similar size boats the 46 conceived as a cruiser and the Swan 45 providing the racer/cruiser alternative.

References

 http://www.nautorgroup.com/461_technical.htm

External links
 Nautor Swan
 German Frers Official Website

Sailing yachts
Keelboats
2000s sailboat type designs
Sailboat types built by Nautor Swan
Sailboat type designs by Germán Frers